Izzard or Izard may refer to:
 Izzard, an 18th-century dialectal name for the letter Z
 Izzard (fanzine), a Hugo-nominated science fiction fanzine
 Izard County, Arkansas
 Pyrenean Chamois or izard, a species of goat-antelope


People with the surname

Izzard
 Bob Izzard, 1930s Australian rugby league player
 Brad Izzard, 1980s Australian rugby league player
 Craig Izzard, 1980s–1990s Australian rugby league player
 Eddie Izzard, English comedian and actor
 Grant Izzard, 1990s Australian rugby league player
 Mark Izzard, Canadian former ice hockey player
 Molly Izzard, (1919–2004), English writer and wife of Ralph Izzard
 Ralph Izzard (1910–1992), English journalist, author, adventurer and naval intelligence officer

Izard
 Alexis Izard (born 1992), French politician
 Carroll Izard (1923–2017), American psychologist known for his contributions to Differential Emotions Theory (DET)
 Charles Beard Izard (1829–1904), New Zealand lawyer and politician; father of
 Charles Hayward Izard (1860–1925), New Zealand lawyer and politician
 George Izard (1776–1828), general in the United States Army during the War of 1812 and governor of the Arkansas Territory
 Mark W. Izard (1799–1866), 2nd Governor of Nebraska Territory
 Stephanie Izard (born 1976), American chef

See also
 Isard (disambiguation)
 Izard (disambiguation)
 Izzard (disambiguation)